Sainte-Croix-du-Verdon (literally Sainte-Croix of Verdon; Provençal: Santa Crotz de Verdon) is a commune in the Alpes-de-Haute-Provence department in southeastern France.

Prior to 16 September 2005, the commune was known as Sainte-Croix-de-Verdon.

Population

See also
 Lac de Sainte-Croix
Communes of the Alpes-de-Haute-Provence department

References

Communes of Alpes-de-Haute-Provence
Alpes-de-Haute-Provence communes articles needing translation from French Wikipedia